Chandler M. Brooks (December 18, 1905 - November 29, 1989) was an American physiologist who studied the nervous system and the heart. He was a member of the National Academy of Sciences.

Brooks was born in West Virginia. After his mother's death the family moved to Massachusetts where he received, in his own account, a mediocre education. That changed when he attended Oberlin College in Ohio and with subsequent graduate study at Princeton University where he received a Ph.D. in 1931 under Philip Bard. He followed Bard to Johns Hopkins University in 1933. In 1948 he became professor and chairman of the department of Physiology and Pharmacology at the Long Island College Hospital School of Medicine in Brooklyn.

Brooks was among the first group of pioneering neuroendocrinologists. In cardiac physiology, Brooks' studies were important in establishing principles that were important in the development of implanted pacemakers. His major works included the study of the autonomic nervous system as well as (in collaboration with John Eccles) the role of Golgi cell in the spinal cord.

He retired in 1972, taking up volunteer philanthropic activities. After the death of his wife of fifty years, Brooks became in 1986 a fellow in the Center for Theological Inquiry in Princeton and pursued theological studies. He died in 1989.

References

1905 births
1989 deaths
American physiologists